Edgeley Park is a football stadium in Edgeley, Stockport, England. Built for rugby league club Stockport RFC in 1891, by 1903, the rugby club was defunct and Stockport County Football Club moved in. The ground is set to be increased to a capacity of around 19900 with the start of the project in 2023.

Edgeley Park is currently an all-seater stadium holding 10,900 spectators. Stockport County shared it with Sale Sharks rugby union club between 2003 and 2012.

In 2015, Stockport Council purchased the stadium for around £2 million, leasing it back to the football club, in order to prevent it from being demolished and redeveloped.

History

The land Edgeley Park  is built on was originally donated to Stockport by the Sykes Family (Owners of Sykes Bleaching Company) in the late 1800s, for sporting use. The stadium was built in 1891 for rugby league club Stockport RFC. Stockport County moved there from Green Lane in 1902, needing to find a bigger stadium to play in following their entrance into the Football League two years earlier. Stockport County's first game at Edgeley Park was a 1–1 draw against Gainsborough Trinity in 1902.

The Sykes family sold the land Edgeley Park stood on to tenants Stockport County in 1932 for a then price of £1600.

The Main Stand of the ground, which at the time was made of wood, burned down in a fire in 1935, destroying all of Stockport County's previous records; therefore, apart from having to rebuild a significant section of the ground, the club had to undertake a massive task to piece together information about previous results, playing squads, etc.

Following the Bradford City stadium fire in 1985, work began to remove all wooden structures and standing terraces from the stadium, which drastically reduced capacity, but increased safety and ensured that the ground complies to Football League regulations. This work was eventually full completed by 2001.The railway end being the last stand to be converted from a standing terrace to seating. The stadium's name is often simply abbreviated to 'EP' by fans.

The record attendance is 27,833, when Liverpool visited Edgeley Park to play Stockport County in the 5th round of the FA Cup in 1950.

The floodlight system was first used with an opening friendly match against Fortuna '54 Geleen of Holland on 16 October 1956, whose side included four members of the Dutch national team that had defeated Belgium the previous week.

The ground once held two matches by the England international football team on the same day. On 14 January 1958 the England squad were due to play training matches at nearby Maine Road, home of Manchester City but the pitch was frozen. Edgeley Park's pitch was deemed playable so it was decided to hold the matches in Stockport instead.

The first game saw England draw 2–2 with a Manchester City XI, and the second saw the England senior side defeat the England U23 side 1–0.

Edgeley Park was the venue for the final of the 1978 World Lacrosse Championship.

Chester City played a home Rumbelows Cup tie against Manchester City at Edgeley Park on 8 October 1991, owing to safety concerns regarding their temporary Moss Rose home.

Stockport County have undertaken an entire redevelopment of the ground since moving into the ground, most notably the building of the Cheadle End which opened in 1995.

Edgeley Park is the closest league football ground to the River Mersey – it is actually closer than Liverpool's Anfield, Everton's Goodison Park or Tranmere Rovers' Prenton Park.

On 31 July 2015 Edgeley Park passed into the ownership of Stockport Council. In February 2022, the club agreed a 250-year lease of Edgeley Park from the council.

In July 2020; due to the COVID −19 pandemic in the UK, sporting venues had their capacities cut. Edgeley Park capacity was reduced to 2,700. However no fans were allowed into the stadium for the start of the 2020–21 season. This did not stop the stadium being redeveloped with new seating put into the Railway End, and new external cladding added to the Cheadle End.

Danny Bergara Stand
The first major development at Edgeley Park was the construction of the original Main Stand on the north (Hardcastle Road) side of the ground. Initially holding around 500 seats, this was a relatively low timber structure and it was totally destroyed by a fire in 1935. It was replaced a year later by the current stand, constructed of brick and steel, a building seen by many as a traditional, old-fashioned stand, typical of football stadia in Northern England. The roof of the Main Stand at Edgeley Park is supported towards the front by three steel columns, which slightly impede the view of supporters from certain seats. Unusually, rather than running the length of the pitch, as would normally be expected in football stadia nowadays, the Main Stand is only about 75 yards long, straddling the half way line, with the gaps at each end containing other club-related buildings.

The Main Stand seats 2,020, of which 405 are executive seats and contains players' changing rooms and some club offices, as well as toilets, boardroom and several bars for half-time refreshments. The team dugouts are situated at the front of the Main Stand.

On 23 May 2012, it was announced that Stockport County were to rename the Main Stand in honour of their late manager Danny Bergara.

Cheadle End

The Cheadle End behind the goal at the west end of the ground is the largest and most modern stand in the stadium, and one of the largest stands outside the Premier League.

The original Cheadle End, built in 1923, was a small covered terrace of largely timber construction, with room for around 3,000 people. It was made all-seater in 1967, and its capacity cut to 1,100. This stand was demolished in 1985, after the Bradford City stadium fire, and replaced by seven steps of shallow uncovered terracing which held only a small number of supporters. However, for the 10 years that it existed, this terrace was extremely popular with County fans because of its traditional feel. Netting was controversially placed in front of the terrace during the late 1980s; after the disaster at Hillsborough Stadium in 1989 the netting was removed.

In 1995, Stockport County chairman Brendan Elwood built a new stand to replace the small terrace. The new Cheadle End is a two-tiered stand, holding 5,044 supporters, making it almost as large in terms of capacity as the other three stands collectively. The stand is all-seater, as is the rest of the stadium nowadays, and was opened in 1995 with a friendly game against Manchester City. The letters "SCFC" are visible in the seating, where white seats are used instead of blue, to symbolise Stockport County Football Club.

The stand holds the Insider Suite, a conference and banqueting facility, as well as the ticket office, toilets, refreshments facilities and the club shops; the club shop is relatively large, and was used by Stockport County until 2005. However, when Sale Sharks owner Brian Kennedy sold Stockport County at that time, they vacated the club shop – moving to a former cupboard under the stairs around the corner. They  returned to the large club shop in November 2012 following Sale Sharks move to Eccles.

Family Stand

On the opposite side of the ground to the Main Stand, running the full length of the pitch, is the Family Stand. It is also often referred to as the Pop Side, Barlow Stand, or the Vernon Stand due to the former sponsorship of the stand by the Vernon Building Society.

The first structure on this side of the ground was a small, covered enclosure with a capacity of 1,400. This was replaced in 1927 with a much larger terraced stand, which in 1965, in a FA Cup match against Liverpool, held 16,000 people. In 1978 the terracing at the rear of the stand was levelled and its capacity halved; eventually, in late 1993, the Pop Side was made all-seater.

It currently holds 2,411 and is occasionally given to larger away supports, if seats are not required by home supporters. There are toilets and refreshment facilities on a small outdoor concourse behind the stand, which backs onto a small reservoir. As with the Main Stand opposite, the roof is supported towards the front by several steel columns; their thickness and location are partly explained by the fact that when the current roof was built, in 1956, it had to be erected in front of an existing roof, which covered only the rear part of the then much deeper and higher terrace.

The Vernon stand also homes the gantry for the club where all the footage for the club is recorded and where commentary takes place.

Railway End

The Railway End, at the east end of the stadium, is a former uncovered terrace that at one time could hold up to 6,000. In 2001, it was the last part of Edgeley Park to be converted to seating, thus making the ground all-seated, and it is now generally used to house away supporters. Still open to the elements, and with a capacity of around 1,366, the Railway End is currently the smallest of all stands in the ground. The stadium scoreboard is located at the rear of the Railway End. 

In the late 1990s, after the recent major development at the Cheadle End of the ground, County chairman Brendan Elwood announced plans to rebuild the Railway End. The plan would have involved purchasing The Bungalow behind it, on which a hotel would have been built by Britannia Building Society, which would have overlooked the ground. However, like other  Millennium-related projects, these plans never came to fruition.

The seating was replaced in 2020 with the letters 'COUNTY' spelled out in white on the blue seats.

Future Development

A consultation is in place to increase the capacity of the stadium to 20,000 from the 10,841 that it currently holds. However all development will be dependent on how the club performs in the league.
The aim is that Phase One will be replacing the East Stand (aka Railway End) from the current 1,366 seats (without a roof) to approximately 4,500 seats (with roof). This will make it similar to the existing West Stand (aka Cheadle End) albeit with a slightly smaller capacity. Plans are for construction to start in 2023. 
Phase Two will be to rebuild the South Stand (aka Pop Side, Family Stand or Barlow Stand) This would then increase the capacity of the stand from 2,411 to 6,500 seats.
Phase Three relates to the Main Stand (aka Danny Bergara Stand) by expanding the existing stand to the full length of the pitch. This would mean an increase in capacity from just over 2,000 to around 3,500 seats.

Gaming
Edgeley Park appears in Rugby Challenge 2 as one of 5 licensed English stadiums.  The stadium also appears on EA Sports Rugby 08.
Edgeley Park appears in the trailer of Football Video Game FIFA 22.

References

External links

 Edgeley Park History
 Internet Football Ground Guide section for Edgeley Park

Football venues in England
Rugby union stadiums in England
Defunct rugby league venues in England
Sports venues in Greater Manchester
Buildings and structures in Stockport
Sale Sharks
Chester City F.C. stadiums
Sports venues completed in 1891
Sport in Stockport
English Football League venues
Lacrosse venues